Partis College on Newbridge Hill, Bath, Somerset, England, was built as large block of almshouses between 1825 and 1827. It has been designated as a Grade I listed building.

It was founded by Ann and Fletcher Partis for women "who had been left in reduced circumstances", and still provides accommodation, in 30 two-storey terraced houses set around three sides of a quadrangle, for women, aged over 50 in membership of the Church of England. Fletcher Partis was a barrister who purchased the land for the almshouses, however he died and the further development was undertaken by his wife.

The building is in a Greek Revival style. The main range has 32-bays with a centre piece with an unfluted Ionic portico fronting the chapel. On each side are wings with five apartments and beyond them pavilions. The east and west ranges each have 16 bays.

The lodge, walls, gates and gatepiers are also listed buildings.

In 1862, George Gilbert Scott redesigned the original chapel, which had been built by Henry Goodridge. In 1929 a new block was added to provide a nursing wing, after funds were given by Dame Violet Wills. In 2015 Right Reverend Peter Hancock the Bishop of Bath and Wells became the patron of the almshouses.

See also
 List of Grade I listed buildings in Bath and North East Somerset

References

External links
 
 

Residential buildings completed in 1827
Grade I listed buildings in Bath, Somerset
Grade I listed almshouses
Buildings and structures in Bath, Somerset
Organisations based in Bath, Somerset
Christianity in Bath, Somerset
Charities based in Somerset
Almshouses in Somerset
1825 establishments in England